Oliver Marach and Florin Mergea won the tournament in 2014, the last time it was held but they chose not to participate this year.

Roberto Carballés Baena and Alejandro Davidovich Fokina won the title, defeating Marcelo Arévalo and Jonny O'Mara in the final, 7–6(7–3), 6–1.

Seeds

Draw

Draw

References

External Links
 Main Draw

2020 ATP Tour
2020 Chile Open - Doubles